Leandro Augusto Caballero (born 13 February 1986) is an Argentine professional footballer who plays as a defender for UAI Urquiza.

Career
Caballero began in the youth of San Vicente de Pinamar in 1992, being on their books until 2001 when he joined Deportivo Pinamar. He also had spells in Nueva Chicago and Deportivo Merlo's academies. His senior career got going with Luján de Cuyo of Torneo Argentino B. In 2010, Caballero signed for Torneo Argentino A's Juventud Unida Universitario. He netted goals against Alumni, Deportivo Maipú and Rivadavia across two seasons. Deportivo Maipú signed him on 30 June 2012. He scored six in thirty-three appearances in 2012–13; he was sent off in his final game versus Santamarina in June 2013.

In 2013, Caballero moved to Independiente Rivadavia. His pro debut came on 13 August versus Gimnasia y Esgrima. After one goal in forty-five matches in all competitions for Independiente Rivadavia, Caballero departed on 12 January 2015 to play for ex-club Nueva Chicago of the Argentine Primera División. He made eight top-flight appearances in the 2015 campaign as the club were relegated to Primera B Nacional. January 2016 saw Caballero leave Argentine football by signing for Paraguayan Primera División side Sol de América. His stay lasted seven months, with Caballero appearing in fifteen fixtures.

He sealed a return to Argentina with Guillermo Brown on 6 July 2016. A further move to third tier UAI Urquiza followed a year later. Defensores de Belgrano became Caballero's ninth senior club in 2018. Having been an unused substitute eight times in the months prior, he made his bow for them on 12 November against Quilmes.

Career statistics
.

References

External links

1986 births
Living people
Sportspeople from Buenos Aires Province
Argentine footballers
Association football defenders
Argentine expatriate footballers
Expatriate footballers in Paraguay
Argentine expatriate sportspeople in Paraguay
Torneo Argentino B players
Torneo Argentino A players
Primera Nacional players
Argentine Primera División players
Paraguayan Primera División players
Primera B Metropolitana players
Asociación Atlética Luján de Cuyo players
Juventud Unida Universitario players
Deportivo Maipú players
Independiente Rivadavia footballers
Nueva Chicago footballers
Club Sol de América footballers
Guillermo Brown footballers
UAI Urquiza players
Defensores de Belgrano footballers
Deportivo Riestra players